Mitrella bruggeni is a species of sea snail in the family Columbellidae, the dove snails. The specific name bruggeni is in honor of Dutch malacologist Adolph Cornelis van Bruggen. It was created as a new name for Mitrella broderipi auct. not Sowerby, 1844.

References

bruggeni
Gastropods described in 1984